The Alaska Aviation Museum, previously the Alaska Aviation Heritage Museum, is located on Lake Hood Seaplane Base in Anchorage, Alaska. Its mission since 1988, is to preserve, display, and honor Alaska's aviation heritage, by preserving and displaying historic aircraft, artifacts, and memorabilia, and to foster public interest in aviation and its history. The museum has over thirty aircraft on display, a restoration hangar, flight simulators, two theaters, and a Hall of Fame. It provides an emphasis on historic aircraft, aviation artifacts, and memorabilia that contributed to the development and progress of aviation in Alaska, including Bush flying, and the World War II Army base on Adak Island.

Overview
The museum is made up of the Main, Rasmuson, South, and Restoration Hangars; as well as a shelter. Also on display is the air traffic control tower cab used at Merrill Field from 1962 to 2002.

History
The Alaskan Historical Aircraft Society was founded in 1977 and the museum opened to the public in 1988.

Collection

 American Pilgrim 100-B 6605
 Beechcraft Model 18S 7728
 Bell UH-1H Iroquois 65-12849
 Boeing 737-290C
 Consolidated OA-10A Catalina 44-33954
 Curtiss P-40E Warhawk
 de Havilland Canada DHC-2 Beaver 1207
 Douglas World Cruiser "Seattle"
 Fairchild 24G 2933
 Grumman G-21A Goose B-102
 Grumman G-44 Widgeon 1312
 Helio Courier
 Keystone-Loening Commuter 313
 McDonnell Douglas GF-15A Eagle 74-0084
 Noorduyn Norseman 507
 Piasecki H-21B 54-4004
 Piper PA-18-150 Super Cub 18-4459
 Stearman C2B 121
 Stinson L-1 Vigilant 41-18915
 Stinson V-77 Reliant 77-36
 Taylorcraft BC-12D 7265
 Taylorcraft L-2 5416
 Travel Air S-6000-B 967
 Waco YKC 3991

Hall of fame

 2000 – Noel Wien
 2001 – Ray Petersen
 2002 – Joe Crosson
 2003 – Carl Ben Eielson
 2004 – Bob Ellis
 2005 – Robert Campbell Reeve
 2006 – Merle "Mudhole" Smith
 2007 – Russel Merrill
 2008 – Art Woodley
 2009 – Ruth M. Jefford
 2010 – Sheldon B. "Shell" Simmons
 2011 
 Harold Gillam, Explorer & Pathfinder Award
 Ed Rasmuson, Lifetime Achievement Award
 Rita & Bobby Sholton, Aviation Entrepreneur Award
 2012 
 A.A. Bennett, Explorer & Pathfinder Award
 Lowell Thomas, Lifetime Achievement Award
 Eva & Wilfred Ryan, Aviation Entrepreneur Award
 2013 
 Dottie & Jim Magoffin, Explorer & Pathfinder Award
 Rex Bishopp, Lifetime Achievement Award
 Cliff Everts, Aviation Entrepreneur Award
 2014 
 Bill English, Explorer & Pathfinder Award
 F. Atlee Dodge, Lifetime Achievement Award
 Jack Peck, Aviation Entrepreneur Award
 2015 
 Frank Dorbandt, Explorer & Pathfinder Award
 George Pappas, Lifetime Achievement Award
 Oren Hudson, Aviation Entrepreneur Award
 2016 
 Stephen E. Mills, Explorer & Pathfinder Award
 Lavelle & Dick Betz, Lifetime Achievement Award
 Harold Esmailka, Aviation Entrepreneur Award
 2017 
 Sam O. White, Explorer & Pathfinder Award
 Holger "Jorgy" Jorgensen, Lifetime Achievement Award
 J. Vic Brown, Aviation Entrepreneur Award
 2018 
 Kenny Neese, Explorer & Pathfinder Award
 Mike Hunt, Lifetime Achievement Award
 Carl Brady, Aviation Entrepreneur Award
 2019 
 Leon "Babe" Alsworth, Explorer & Pathfinder Award
 Jim Jansen, Lifetime Achievement Award
 Hans Roald Amundsen, Aviation Entrepreneur Award

See also 
 History of aviation in Alaska
 List of airlines in Alaska
 List of Alaskan Hall of Fame pilots

References

External links
 Official Website

Aerospace museums in Alaska
Museums in Anchorage, Alaska
Museums established in 1988
1988 establishments in Alaska